Kheïr Eddine is a district in Mostaganem Province, Algeria. It was named after its capital, Kheïr Eddine.

Municipalities
The district is further divided into 3 municipalities:
Kheïr Eddine
Aïn Boudinar
Sayada

Districts of Mostaganem Province